Radium Queen may refer to:

 , a tugboat of Northern Transportation Company, serving on the upper Slave River
 —see Steamboats of the upper Columbia and Kootenay Rivers

See also
 Radium King

Ship names